Joris Mathijsen (born 5 April 1980) is a Dutch former professional footballer who played as a centre-back. He is the director of football at Willem II.

Club career
Mathijsen started his football career at SV VOAB in Goirle after he visited a training session of a friend as a young boy. At the age of nine, he left this club and came through the youth system of Willem II. He was promoted to the first team for the 1998–99 season, making his debut on 27 February 1999 in a match against FC Utrecht. After six seasons at Willem II, he was sold by manager Co Adriaanse to AZ. However, he endured a harder time breaking into the first team with AZ and his case was not helped by injuries.

After finishing as runners-up in the Eredivisie in 2006, Mathijsen opted to transfer to German Bundesliga side Hamburger SV for €6 million, where he teamed up with fellow Dutchmen Rafael van der Vaart and Nigel de Jong. He scored Hamburg's 2,500th Bundesliga goal (his first for the club) on 20 October 2007 against VfB Stuttgart.

In November 2008, Mathijsen signed a new contract extension, tying him to Hamburg until the summer of 2012. In mid-June 2011, however, he signed a two-year contract with Spanish La Liga side Málaga.

In the summer of 2012, it became apparent that Málaga was willing to let Mathijsen transfer to another club, prompting several Dutch sides to show interest, including Feyenoord and Ajax; on 10 August, Mathijsen signed with the former.

International career

On 17 November 2004, Mathijsen made his international debut for the Netherlands against Andorra in a 3–0 away win.

Since his international debut, Mathijsen became a mainstay figure in the national team, especially after impressing with Hamburger SV. He was usually positioned as left central defender, because of his strong left-foot.  He was called up to the Dutch squad for UEFA Euro 2008 in Austria and Switzerland. Initially in danger of losing his spot to Wilfred Bouma, he followed it up with a decent enough performance at the Euro 2008 and remained first-choice.

Mathijsen was ever present for Oranje during the 2010 FIFA World Cup qualifying. He played more minutes than any other player in the Dutch squad and played a key role in their record of having conceded the fewest goals in their qualifying group.

Mathijsen was part of the Dutch team for the 2010 World Cup, managed by Bert van Marwijk. The player was in the starting line-up for their first match in the competition, a 2–0 victory over Denmark, and started in all their matches on the way to the final.

Career statistics

International

Scores and results list Netherlands' goal tally first, score column indicates score after each Mathijsen goal.

References

External links

 Joris Mathijsen at Voetbal International 
 
 
 
 2010 FIFA World Cup profile
 

1980 births
Living people
People from Goirle
Dutch footballers
Footballers from North Brabant
Association football defenders
Netherlands international footballers
Eredivisie players
Bundesliga players
La Liga players
Willem II (football club) players
AZ Alkmaar players
Feyenoord players
Hamburger SV players
Málaga CF players
2006 FIFA World Cup players
2010 FIFA World Cup players
UEFA Euro 2008 players
UEFA Euro 2012 players
Dutch expatriate footballers
Dutch expatriate sportspeople in Germany
Expatriate footballers in Germany
Dutch expatriate sportspeople in Spain
Expatriate footballers in Spain
Willem II (football club) non-playing staff